Clavelina ("little bottle") is genus of sea squirts (the Ascidiacea), containing the following species:

Clavelina amplexa Kott, 2002
Clavelina arafurensis Tokioka, 1952
Clavelina auracea Monniot, 1997
Clavelina australis (Herdman, 1899)
Clavelina baudinensis Kott, 1957
Clavelina borealis Savigny, 1816
Clavelina brasiliensis (Millar, 1977)
Clavelina breve Monniot, 1997
Clavelina coerulea Oka, 1934
Clavelina concrescens Hartmeyer, 1924
Clavelina cyclus Tokioka & Nishikawa, 1975
Clavelina cylindrica (Quoy & Gaimard, 1834)
Clavelina dagysa (Kott, 1957)
Clavelina dellavallei (Zirpolo, 1825)
Clavelina detorta (Sluiter, 1904)
Clavelina elegans (Oka, 1927)
Clavelina enormis Herdman, 1880
Clavelina fasciculata Van Name, 1945
Clavelina fecunda (Sluiter, 1904)
Clavelina gemmae Turon, 2005
Clavelina huntsmani Van Name, 1931
Clavelina kottae (Millar, 1960)
Clavelina lepadiformis (Müller, 1776)
Clavelina maculata Monniot & Monniot, 2001
Clavelina meridionalis (Herdman, 1891)
Clavelina michaelseni Millar, 1982
Clavelina miniata Watanabe & Tokioka, 1973
Clavelina minuta Tokioka, 1962
Clavelina mirabilis Kott, 1972
Clavelina moluccensis (Sluiter, 1904)
Clavelina neapolitana Della Valle, 1881
Clavelina nigra Kott, 1990
Clavelina obesa Nishikawa & Tokioka, 1976
Clavelina oblonga Herdman, 1880
Clavelina oliva Kott, 1990
Clavelina ostrearium (Michaelsen, 1930)
Clavelina phlegraea Salfi, 1929
Clavelina picta (Verrill, 1900)
Clavelina polycitorella (Tokioka, 1954)
Clavelina pseudobaudinensis (Kott, 1976)
Clavelina puertosecensis Millar & Goodbody, 1974
Clavelina robusta Kott, 1990
Clavelina roseola Millar, 1955
Clavelina sabbadini Brunetti, 1987
Clavelina simplex Kott, 2006
Clavelina steenbrasensis Millar, 1955
Clavelina viola Tokioka & Nishikawa, 1976

References 

Enterogona
Tunicate genera
Taxa named by Marie Jules César Savigny